Emotion is the eighth solo studio album by country pop singer Juice Newton.  It was released by RCA Records in 1987 and was the last of Newton's albums to appear on the Billboard charts.

Overview
Juice Newton began her recording career in 1975 but did not achieve major stardom until the release of her 1981 album Juice.  The album was a crossover success and yielded three hit singles, "Angel of the Morning", "Queen of Hearts", and "The Sweetest Thing (I've Ever Known)".  The last of these peaked at number one on the Billboard Country Chart. She followed Juice with Quiet Lies (1982), an album that brought her two more hits, "Love's Been a Little Bit Hard on Me" and "Break It to Me Gently", of which the latter earned her the Grammy Award for Best Country Vocal Performance, Female.  Newton's 1985 album Old Flame was her country breakthrough, spawning three number one hits "You Make Me Want to Make You Mine",  "Hurt", and the duet with Eddie Rabbitt "Both to Each Other (Friends & Lovers)" and also three additional Top Ten hits: "Old Flame", "Cheap Love", and "What Can I Do with My Heart".

Regarding her music Newton stated in 1987, "It's country-rock or pop-country or Nashville rock or some word like that, but I feel it's the same kind of music that Fleetwood Mac was. To me, that music was folk-rock."

Emotion was released by RCA Records in 1987. It was the last of Newton's albums to appear on Billboard's Top Country album chart and peaked at number 59. The album had two single releases. "First Time Caller" peaked at number 24 on Billboard's Hot Country Songs chart on September 12, 1987, while "Tell Me True" peaked at number 8 on the same chart on February 27, 1988.  Also featured on the album are "Emotions", a song originally recorded by Brenda Lee that peaked at number 7 on the Billboard Hot 100 chart in 1961, and "'Til You Cry", which later became a hit for country singer Eddy Raven, peaking at number 4 on the Hot Country Songs chart in 1989.

In discussing Emotion, music  historian Neil Daniels noted:
With Emotion, Newton chose not to follow in the country rock footsteps of Old Flame and instead opted for a more dulcet, thoughtful sounding release.  Emotion'''s more upbeat songs are "Tell Me True" and "Walkin' Into Trouble", with the rest of the material being a far more quiet affair such as the beautiful "First Time Caller". Nevertheless her vocals are truly magnetic. Other standout performances include "The Old Bye And Bye", written by her longtime collaborator Otha Young and a rich version of Deborah Allen's "If I Didn’t Love You". "I Still Love You" and "Someone Believed" are both sung with enviable passion. Emotion'' is a daunting album rich in emotional texture and a mellow vibe. It was misunderstood upon its original release.

Track listing

Personnel

Juice Newton – vocals
Dean Parks, Johnny Pierce – acoustic guitar
Beth Anderson – backing vocals
Donna Davidson – backing vocals
Herb Pedersen – backing vocals
Jerry Whitman – backing vocals
Jim Haas – backing vocals
Jon Joyce – backing vocals
Susan Boyd – backing vocals
Vince Gill – backing vocals
Neil Stubenhaus – bass
Carlos Vega, John Robinson – drums
Dann Huff – electric guitar
George Doering – electric guitar
Tommy Morgan – harmonica
Jim Lang – organ
Jay Dee Maness – pedal steel guitar
Richard Landis – percussion, synthesizer
Philip Aaberg – piano
David Woodford – saxophone
Alan Pasqua – synthesizer
Luis Cabaza – synthesizer

References

1987 albums
Juice Newton albums
Albums produced by Richard Landis
RCA Records albums